Keystone Resort is a ski resort located in Keystone, Colorado, United States. Since 1997 the resort has been owned and operated by Vail Resorts. It consists of three mountains – Dercum Mountain, North Peak, the Outback – and five Bowls (Independence, Erickson, Bergman, North and South Bowls) offering skiing at all levels. The three mountains are connected by a series of ski lifts and gondolas and access from two base areas called River Run and Mountain House.

In the winter, Keystone offers night skiing, a five-acre resurfaced ice skating lake, sleigh rides and several fine-dining restaurants.

In summer, Keystone provides lift access for mountain hiking, events and hundreds of miles of single-track mountain biking.

History
In the 1940s, Max Dercum left his job as a forestry professor and ski racing coach at Penn State University to work for the Forest Service as a forester and fire spotter in Colorado. He and his wife Edna first lived in Georgetown before settling on a ranch, just outside the village of Keystone. They quickly developed a reputation for having fun. From sledding down Loveland Pass at night, with the following car’s headlights the only illumination, to Max’s turn as a rodeo clown at the summer rodeo, to the clarinet and piano music they would entertain with, fun was the Dercums’ business.

But more than anything, they loved skiing. They skied at the Climax Mine, Loveland and Berthoud Passes, Loveland Ski Area and Steamboat. After a race at Loveland Pass, Max filed mining claims for land around an alpine cirque that he hoped to develop into a ski area. Max served as the "Head Coach" of the ski school and Edna quickly followed as the first female instructor at the school.

Founding the Resort 
With his knowledge of forestry and skiing, Max determined that it would be a perfect place for a ski area. Throughout the 1950s and 60s, Max hiked every inch of the mountain, drawing up plans for the ski area. He even created a papier-mâché model of the mountain ranges and painted his dream ski area on it. After discussing this dream at a New Year’s party (1968-1969), Bill Bergman, a corporate lawyer from Cedar Rapids, Iowa, also fell in love with the idea of Keystone. At 3 am New Year’s Day, Bill and Max made a handshake deal to found Keystone International, with a goal to create a ski resort.

The summers of 1969 and 1970 was nothing but action and activity. Bill and Max wanted to respect the mountain environment and history of the area in the development of a year-round resort. They hired lumbermen to hand cut the ski trails, which Max laid out to follow the natural contours of the mountain. Rather than build additional roads on the mountain, they utilized the old timber and mining roads and installed the lift towers with helicopters. A wetland easement was also included in the development so no building would be directly on the Snake River.

Keystone opened on November 21, 1970.

In May of 1974 Keystone was acquired by Ralston Purina

1976 Winter Olympics 
Independence Mountain was an Olympic finalist and nearly selected for the signature alpine skiing downhill event for the ill-fated 1976 Winter Olympic Games initially awarded to Denver, USA. Lands owned by the Denver Water Board at the base of Independence Mountain were given serious consideration by the Forest Service as an alternative second base area for Keystone ski area to reduce vehicle and skier congestion at the existing portals, and as an alternative ski lift connection and new portal serving the backside of Arapahoe Basin ski area. Speculation about conflicts in the Snake River Valley with the lynx reintroduction program stifled further study and land allocation. Prior to formal expansion of Keystone ski area onto Independence Mountain this terrain was under permit by multiple guide and outfitters in the 1970s and 80s using snowcats and helicopters for alpine skiing.

North Peak expansion 
North Peak opened for skiing in 1984. Two trails, Diamond Back and Mozart allow access to North Peak from Dercum Mountain. North Peak initially featured 7 trails, serviced by two Lift Engineering triple chairlifts. Santiago serviced the North Peak pod, while Teller, now known as Ruby Express, provided egress back to Dercum Mountain. As part of the expansion, a second base area was opened at River Run, with a gondola running all the way to the Summit House. This easterly expansion of Dercum Mountain also saw the introduction of several trails in the Spring Dipper area, and a new triple chairlift, Erickson, to service them. 

In 1986, the original River Run Gondola was removed and replaced with a new gondola constructed by Von Roll, reusing the original gondola terminals.

1990s
In 1990, Keystone entered the detachable industry as Doppelmayr constructed two high speed quads to replace aging lifts on Dercum Mountain. The Peru Express lift replaced a Heron Poma double, providing nonstop access from the Mountain House base area to the Packsaddle Bowl and west side of the mountain. It was supplemented by the Montezuma Express lift, which replaced a Yan triple chairlift and provided access to all trails on the upper and central part of Dercum Mountain.

In 1991, Keystone opened an expansion into the Outback, located beyond North Peak. Doppelmayr constructed three new lifts to service the expansion. A two-way gondola, known as the Outpost Gondola, was built from the summit of Dercum Mountain over to North Peak. Within the expansion, a new high speed quad known as the Outback Express was built to service the Outback trails, and a fixed grip quad known as Wayback was built to service two access trails leading to the Outback as well as provide egress from the area.

In 1996, Vail Resorts announced plans to acquire Keystone and Breckenridge's parent company Ralston Resorts Inc. from Ralston Purina. The merger was approved by the U.S. Department of Justice on January 3, 1997.

In 1997, the Erickson triple chairlift on Dercum Mountain was removed and replaced with a new Doppelmayr high speed quad, named the Summit Express, running parallel to the River Run Gondola for its entire length. That same year, a new triple chairlift known as Ranger was built to open up a learning area at the summit of Dercum Mountain.

In 1998, the Santiago Express was built to replace the Santiago triple chairlift on North Peak.

2000s
In 2000, the original Ruby (then Teller) lift was removed and replaced with a high speed six pack. The Ruby Express was constructed by Poma and provided faster egress out of North Peak and the Outback.

In 2008, the River Run Gondola, nearing 22 years of continuous service, was retired and replaced with a new gondola. Doppelmayr constructed the replacement River Run Gondola, which had its base area terminal moved from adjacent to the Summit Express to a new location across the river, shortening the walking distance for guests. The new gondola also features a mid-station, allowing guests to upload or download from midway up Dercum Mountain, as well as service a new learning area.

2010s 
In 2014, the Outback Express was given a capacity upgrade to 2,400 pph, using chairs transferred over from the Peru Express and Montezuma Express lifts.

For the 2017 season, Keystone built their second high speed six pack, bringing in Leitner-Poma to replace the Montezuma Express lift. Parts from the old lift were relocated to Beaver Creek Resort and used to construct their Red Buffalo Express.

2020s 
In 2021, Keystone completed the upgrade of the Peru Express lift, replacing it with a high-speed 6-passenger chair. Part of this project also included removing the Argentine Chair, which was an original lift from the resort.

In 2022, Keystone will be expanding its lift-serviced terrain into Bergman Bowl, including a new chairlift, new trails, new snowmaking and a ~6000sqft expansion of the Outpost Restaurant. While this area of the resort is currently open for hike-to accessed skiing and riding, this project unlocks access for novice and intermediate guests and provides expanded entry to expert terrain in Independence and Erickson Bowls.

Resort statistics

Elevation
Base: 
Summit: 
Vertical Rise:

Trails
Skiable Area: 
Trails: 130 total (12% beginner, 39% intermediate, 49% advanced/expert)
Bowls: Independence, Bergman, Erickson, North, and South
Longest Run: Schoolmarm - 
Average Annual Snowfall: 
Terrain Parks:
The A51 Terrain Park, a section of the resort with various features including for trick performance. 
51 rails and funboxes.

Slope Aspects
North: 47%
 East: 13%
 West: 30%
 South: 10%

Terrain park
Keystone Resort features the "A51 Terrain Park" on Dercum Mountain, which has been noted as one of the more progressive terrain parks in the region.

Lifts
 Keystone has 12  chairlifts, and 8 surface lifts. 

Keystone has 8 surface lifts: Midway Carpets (2), Kokomo Carpet (2), Double Barrel Carpet (2), Triangle Carpet, Ski School Carpet, and the Tubing Hill Carpet

Teller Lift Accident 
The Teller Lift was a Yan 1000 model triple chair installed in 1984 as part of the North Peak expansion. On December 14th, 1985 the upper bullwheel disconnected from the main gearbox shaft, resulting in dozens of lift riders being thrown from their chairs onto the slope below. Two riders were killed and an additional 47 were injured. Faulty welding was blamed for the accident.  The lift was rebuilt by Yan as the Ruby Lift, free of charge. Settlements between Yan and injured skiers topped over seven million dollars.

Summer activities
During the summer, visitors to Keystone resort often participate in hiking, horseback riding, fly-fishing, whitewater rafting, paddle boat and stand up paddle board rentals and mountain biking.

Keystone Resort is also home to two 18-hole championship golf courses, The Ranch and River Run. The Ranch course was designed by Robert Trent Jones Jr. and is situated next to a historic ranching homestead.

USDA Forest Service
Keystone ski area operates on National Forest System lands under special use permit to the Forest Service. The 30-year special use permit assigns to the permit holder only a portion of the bundle of rights normally associated with real estate ownership. For the privilege of using federal lands the ski area pays an annual fee of about one dollar per skier visitor to the U.S. Treasury. Twenty-five percent of those fees are returned to Summit County, Colorado, for roads and schools. The Forest Service approves all master development plan revisions, environmental impact statements, summer and winter operations plans, and construction plans prior to opening. The 1984 Land and Resource Management Plan and 2002 Revision, authored by Erik Martin, Program Manager for Ski Area Administration (1972–2003), WRNF, established the final expanded boundary perimeter for Keystone Resort, including eventual expansion of developed skiing onto Independence Mountain. The 2002 Forest Plan Revision suggested an aerial transportation corridor and south portal be constructed in the Swan Valley to provide direct access between Keystone ski area and the Town of Breckenridge to improve traffic safety, reduce vehicle congestion, decrease dust and hydrocarbon emissions, and increase skier convenience.

References

External links
Keystone Ski Resort's website
Google Map with buildings/attractions/bus stops/etc. marked
Keystone Terrain Park Information
Staying in Keystone and Lodging information

Ski areas and resorts in Colorado
Buildings and structures in Summit County, Colorado
White River National Forest
Ralston Purina
Vail Resorts
Tourist attractions in Summit County, Colorado
1970 establishments in Colorado
Hospitality companies established in 1970